The City of London Corporation owns and maintains open space in and around Greater London.

They have mainly been acquired since 1878, when two Acts of Parliament entrusted the management of Epping Forest and several other areas within a 25-mile (40 km) radius to the corporation: these areas laid the foundation for the Green Belt in the 20th century. On dedicating the opening of Epping Forest on 6 May 1882, Queen Victoria said "It gives me the greatest satisfaction to dedicate this beautiful forest to the use and enjoyment of my people for all time."

Within the City

The city has no sizeable parks within its boundary, but does have a network of a large number of gardens and small open spaces, many of them maintained by the corporation. These range from formal gardens such as the one in Finsbury Circus, containing a bowling green and bandstand, to churchyards such as St Olave Hart Street, to water features and artwork in courtyards and pedestrianised lanes.
There are 150 smaller areas within the square mile of the City of London, including:

 Barber-Surgeon's Hall Garden, London Wall
Cleary Garden, Queen Victoria Street
Churchyard at St Olave Hart Street
Courtyard of St Vedast Foster Lane 
 Finsbury Circus, Blomfield Street/London Wall/Moorgate
 Jubilee Garden, Houndsditch
 Portsoken Street Garden, Portsoken Street/Goodman's Yard
 Postman's Park, Little Britain
Seething Lane Garden, Seething Lane
 St Dunstan-in-the-East, St Dunstan's Hill
 St Mary Aldermanbury, Aldermanbury
 St Olave Hart Street churchyard, Seething Lane
 St Paul's churchyard, St Paul's Cathedral
 West Smithfield Garden, West Smithfield
 Whittington Gardens, College Street

Outside the City
The total managed area is 4,200 hectares. Included in the open spaces are:
 Hampstead Heath 274 hectares. Located in the boroughs of Camden and Barnet
 Epping Forest, 3,188 hectares. Largest public open space in the London area.
 Burnham Beeches, 218 hectares. An area in Buckinghamshire purchased 1880.
 Stoke Common, 83 hectares in Buckinghamshire.
 The City Commons, seven green spaces in South London and Surrey managed by the corporation:
 Ashtead Common, 200 hectares
 Farthing Downs, 95 hectares
 Coulsdon Common, 51 hectares
 Kenley Common, 56 hectares
 Riddlesdown Common, 43 hectares
 Spring Park, 20 hectares
 West Wickham Common, 10 hectares
 Highgate Wood 28 hectares Purchased in 1886
 Queen's Park in northwest London, 12 hectares. Purchased 1886, having been the site of 1879 Royal Agricultural Exhibition
 West Ham Park, 31 hectares. Purchased 1874

It also has an interest in the Downlands Countryside Management Project in South-east London.

References

External links
City of London open spaces
Gardens of the City of London

 
Parks and open spaces